Galegos (São Martinho) is a Portuguese parish, located in the municipality of Barcelos. The population in 2011 was 1,930, in an area of 3.12 km².

References

Freguesias of Barcelos, Portugal